Lecanora kalbii is a species of crustose lichen in the family Lecanoraceae. Found in the Galápagos Islands, it was described as a new species in 2020 by lichenologists Frank Bungartz and John Alan Elix. The specific epithet kalbii honours German lichenologist Klaus Kalb.

See also
List of Lecanora species

References

kalbii
Lichen species
Lichens described in 2020
Taxa named by John Alan Elix
Lichens of the Galápagos Islands